The Freedom Front Plus (FF Plus; , VF Plus) is a right-wing political party in South Africa that was formed (as the Freedom Front) in 1994. It is led by Pieter Groenewald. Its current stated policy positions include abolishing affirmative action, replacing it with merit based appointments, and being firmly against the proposed expropriation without compensation land reform movement to protect the rights and interests of minorities, especially Afrikaners and Afrikaans speaking Coloureds. The party also supports greater self-determination for minorities throughout South Africa, and expressly has adopted Cape Independence as an official party position.

History

Origins as the Freedom Front (19942003)
The Freedom Front was founded on 1 March 1994 by members of the Afrikaner community under Constand Viljoen, after he had left the Afrikaner Volksfront amidst disagreements. Seeking to achieve his goals through political means, Viljoen registered the Freedom Front with the Independent Electoral Commission (IEC) on 4 March 1994 to take part in the April 1994 general elections. (This date has also been given as 7 March.) On 12 March 1994 Viljoen handed in a list of candidates for the FF to the IEC, confirming that his party would take part in the elections.

In the election, under the leadership of Viljoen, the Freedom Front received 2.2% of the national vote (with 424,555 votes cast), earning nine seats in the National Assembly, and 3.3% (with 639,643 votes cast) of the combined vote to the nine provincial legislatures. This suggested that many Afrikaners had split their vote. The party performed the best in the rural areas of the former Transvaal and Orange Free State, and was noted by the new deputy president Thabo Mbeki as representing possibly as much as half the Afrikaner voting population in these areas, with the strongest support among farmers and the working class.

Freedom Front support would gradually melt away in the coming years, as the party was strung along in ultimately fruitless negotiations with the African National Congress (ANC) to create a Volkstaat making the party lose its importance. It would also receive increased competition from new parties such as the Afrikaner Eenheidsbeweging. In the 1999 election their support dropped to 0.8% (127,217 votes cast) with three seats in the National Assembly and between 1-2% in their stronghold provinces. This represented a respectable portion of the Afrikaner vote, but nowhere near earlier levels. The party's support remained relatively stable in all national elections held during the next twenty years.

In 2001, Viljoen handed over the leadership of the Freedom Front to Pieter Mulder.

Formation of the FF+ and early years (20032016)

In 2003, shortly before the 2004 general election, the Conservative Party, the Afrikaner Eenheidsbeweging and the Freedom Front decided to contest the election as a single entity under the name Freedom Front Plus (FF+), led by Mulder. Later, also the Federal Alliance joined the VF+/FF+.

Under Mulder's leadership the party's support remained relatively stable.

In the 2004 general election, support for the Freedom Front Plus rose slightly to 0.89% (139,465 votes cast). The party won one seat in most of the provincial legislatures, and four seats in the National Assembly.

In the 2006 municipal elections, the Freedom Front Plus received 1% of the popular vote (252,253 votes cast).

In the 2009 general election, the party received 0.83% (146,796 votes cast) and retained its four seats in the National Assembly but lost its seats in the provincial legislatures of North West, Mpumalanga and Northern Cape. After the elections, the Freedom Front's leader Pieter Mulder was appointed as Deputy Minister of Agriculture, Forestry and Fisheries by the new President Jacob Zuma.

In the 2014 general election, the FF Plus increased its vote slightly to 0.9%. It retained its 4 MPs, and also regained a seat in the North West.

The party also enjoyed consistent landslide victories in the Afrikaner enclave Orania.

Along with other parties, the FF Plus entered into coalition with the Democratic Alliance (DA) after the 2016 municipal elections to govern Johannesburg, Tshwane and several other municipalities.

Groenewald leadership and resurgence (2016present)
In 2016 Pieter Groenewald took over leadership of the FF Plus. He oversaw a pivot of the party away from being an exclusive abode for Afrikaners to that of one for all minorities, with a special focus on Afrikaans-speaking minorities. This was highlighted when the FF Plus and the Bruin Bemagtiging Beweging (Brown Movement)  an interest group focused on Coloureds led by Peter Marais, the former premier of the Western Cape  formed an official alliance. This ultimately led to Marais being elected as the party's candidate for premier of the Western Cape for the 2019 elections.

2019 national and provincial elections 
FF Plus voter support increased substantially in the 2019 general election, with the party growing its vote total by 250,000, to 2.38% of the national vote, earning ten seats in the National Assembly. This was more than the nine seats that the old Freedom Front had received in 1994. Additionally, it gained eight seats in the provincial legislatures, for a total of eleven. In the 2014 general election, the FF Plus won seats in three provincial legislatures, in 2019, it won seats in eight out of the nine provincial legislatures. Its new supporters were largely Afrikaners and Coloured voters from the Western Cape who had previously supported the DA.

Since the 2019 general election, the FF Plus has also won three wards from the Democratic Alliance (DA) in municipal by-elections in the North West Province and has continued to show growth in various other municipal by-elections in Gauteng, Limpopo and Mpumalanga.

2021 municipal elections 
In the run up to the 2021 local government elections, the FF Plus adopted Cape Independence as an official party position. They and CapeXit had a joint election campaign in the Western Cape to highlight the party's stance on Cape Independence. Over 60% of the FF Plus's ward councillors standing in the Western Cape were Coloureds, with Lennit Max being the party's candidate for mayor of Cape Town. The party claims that their candidates are selected purely on merit in contrast to the DA.

The FF Plus continued their gains in the Western Cape as a result, being in the kingmaker position in over 6 districts.

Leaders

Electoral performance 

These tables show the electoral performance for the Freedom Front Plus since the advent of democracy in 1994:

National elections

|-
! Election
! Total votes
! Share of vote
! Seats 
! +/-
! Government
|-
! 1994
| 424,555
| 2.17%
| 
| –
| 
|-
! 1999
| 127,217
| 0.80%
| 
|  6
| 
|-
! 2004
| 139,465
| 0.89%
| 
|  1
| 
|-
! 2009
| 146,796
| 0.83%
| 
|  ±0
| 
|-
! 2014
| 165,715
| 0.90%
| 
|  ±0
| 
|-
! 2019
| 414,864
| 2.38%
| 
|  6
| 
|}

Provincial elections

! rowspan=2 | Election
! colspan=2 | Eastern Cape
! colspan=2 | Free State
! colspan=2 | Gauteng
! colspan=2 | Kwazulu-Natal
! colspan=2 | Limpopo
! colspan=2 | Mpumalanga
! colspan=2 | North-West
! colspan=2 | Northern Cape
! colspan=2 | Western Cape
|-
! % !! Seats
! % !! Seats
! % !! Seats
! % !! Seats
! % !! Seats
! % !! Seats
! % !! Seats
! % !! Seats
! % !! Seats
|-
! 1994
| 0.8% || 0/56
| 6.0% || 2/30
| 6.2% || 5/86
| 0.5% || 0/81
| 2.2% || 1/40
| 5.7% || 2/30
| 4.6% || 1/30
| 6.0% || 2/30
| 2.1% || 1/42
|-
! 1999
| 0.3% || 0/63
| 2.1% || 1/30
| 1.3% || 1/73
| 0.2% || 0/80
| 0.7% || 0/49
| 1.7% || 1/30
| 1.4% || 1/33
| 1.7% || 1/30
| 0.4% || 0/42
|-
! 2004
| 0.3% || 0/63
| 2.5% || 1/30
| 1.3% || 1/73
| 0.3% || 0/80
| 0.6% || 0/49
| 1.2% || 1/30
| 1.3% || 1/33
| 1.6% || 1/30
| 0.6% || 0/42
|-
! 2009
| 0.2% || 0/63
| 2.0% || 1/30
| 1.6% || 1/73
| 0.8% || 0/80
| 0.6% || 0/49
| 0.9% || 0/30
| 1.8% || 0/33
| 1.2% || 0/30
| 0.4% || 0/42
|-
! 2014
| 0.3% || 0/63
| 2.1% || 1/30
| 1.2% || 1/73
| 0.2% || 0/80
| 0.7% || 0/49
| 0.8% || 0/30
| 1.7% || 1/33
| 1.1% || 0/30
| 0.6% || 0/42
|-
! 2019
| 0.6% || 1/63
| 4.0% || 1/30
| 3.6% || 3/73
| 0.3% || 0/80
| 1.4% || 1/49
| 2.4% || 1/30
| 4.3% || 2/33
| 2.7% || 1/30
| 1.6% || 1/42
|}

Municipal elections

|-
! Election
! Ward + PR votes
! Share of vote
|-
! 1995–96
| 230 845
| 2.7%
|-
! 2000
| 
| 0.1%
|-
! 2006
| 185 960
| 0.9%
|-
! 2011
| 120,519
| 0.5%
|-
! 2016
| 229,281
| 0.8%
|-
! 2021
| 549,349
| 2.34%
|-
|}

See also

 Afrikaners
 Cape Independence
 Coloureds

References

External links

SA Talent
Unrepresented Nations and Peoples Organisation

Articles containing Afrikaans-language text
1994 establishments in South Africa
Afrikaner nationalism
Afrikaner organizations
Boer nationalism
Conservative parties in South Africa
Members of the Unrepresented Nations and Peoples Organization
Nationalist parties in South Africa
Political parties established in 1994
Political parties in South Africa
Political parties of minorities
Separatism in South Africa
White nationalist parties
Protestant political parties
Social conservative parties
National conservative parties
Right-wing populist parties